10¢ a Dance is the debut studio album by the Flirts, a New York-based female vocal trio formed by record producer and songwriter Bobby Orlando. The album was released in 1982 by "O" Records. In the Netherlands, it was retitled Passion.

Critical reception

In a retrospective review for AllMusic, critic Alex Henderson wrote of the album, "from power pop to dance-pop, 10 Cents a Dance is about as fun-loving as it gets."

Track listing

Charts

References

External links
 

1982 debut albums
Albums produced by Bobby Orlando